The Marche regional election of 1970 took place on 7–8 June 1970.

Events
Christian Democracy was the largest party. After the election, Christian Democrat Giuseppe Serrini formed a government including also the Italian Socialist Party, the Unitary Socialist Party and the Italian Republican Party (organic Centre-left). Dino Tiberi took over from Serrini in 1972.

Results

Source: Ministry of the Interior

References

Elections in Marche
1970 elections in Italy